Andrew Paterson (born 21 October 1947) is a New Zealand cricketer. He played in one first-class match for Central Districts in 1973/74.

See also
 List of Central Districts representative cricketers

References

External links
 

1947 births
Living people
New Zealand cricketers
Central Districts cricketers
Cricketers from Wellington City